Oakthorpe Invitational Rugby Football Club, also known as Oakthorpe, is an invitational rugby club based in Oxfordshire. The club was founded by a group of Rugby enthusiasts hailing from various academic institutions amid the partisan climate of the summer of 2006. Since then the club has become an official ORFU recognised side, playing invitational exhibition fixtures against clubs and touring old boy sides and entering 7s, 10s and 15s competitions across the UK.

English rugby union teams
University and college rugby union clubs in England